Mohiuddin Faroque was a Bangladeshi art director, production designer and actor. He won Bangladesh National Film Award for Best Art Direction seven times for the films Bosundhora (1977), Dumurer Phool (1978), Pita Mata Santan (1991), Padma Nadir Majhi (1993), Dukhai (1997), Meghla Akash (2001) and Obujh Bou (2010).
He died on April 17, 2020.

Selected films

As an actor
 Itihaas - 2002

As a director
 Rajlokkhi Srikanto - 1987
 Padma Nadir Majhi - 1993

As an art director

Awards and nominations
National Film Awards

References

External links
 

Bangladeshi actors
Bangladeshi directors
Best Art Direction National Film Award (Bangladesh) winners
Bangladeshi art directors
Year of birth missing
2020 deaths